Yuriy Nadtochiy (born 3 July 1967) is a Ukrainian former professional football defender who played most of his career in Desna Chernihiv.

Career
In 1985, he started his career with Desna Chernihiv the main club in Chernihiv. Here he stayed until 1997, where he played 277 games and scored 5 goals and improving to second place in the 1982 season (Zone 6). In 1997 he moved to Gomel in the city of Gomel in Belarus, where he manged to win the Belarusian First League in the season 1997. Then he returned to Ukraine joining Slavutych Chernobyl in the city of Slavutych and then he ended his career with Domostroitel Chernihiv a team in the city of Chernihiv. In 2016 he took part of Veterans of Desna Chernihiv took part in an international football tournament, which took place in Zhodino, Belarus. The honor of the Chernihiv region in Belarus was defended by Savenchuk Alexander, Andrey Belousov, Selivanov Alexander, Rubanchuk Valery, Team Peter, Matsuta Vladimir, Prokha Oleg, Zhornyak Igor, Pilipeyko Peter, Simchuk Igor.

Honours
Gomel
 Belarusian First League: 1997

Desna Chernihiv
 Ukrainian Second League: 1996–97

References

External links
 footballfacts.ru

1967 births
Living people
Footballers from Chernihiv
Soviet footballers
FC Desna Chernihiv players
FC Gomel players
FC Slavutych players
Belarusian First League players
Ukrainian Second League players
Association football defenders
Ukrainian footballers
Ukrainian expatriate footballers
Expatriate footballers in Belarus
Ukrainian expatriate sportspeople in Belarus